Manda Collins is an author of romance novels. Most of her books are regency romances, but she has also written a contemporary romance novels novella, Legally Yours.

Her Wicked Widows series are Regency romance novels with an element of mystery, about women with unhappy first marriages who fall in love with better men after their first husbands have died.

Collins' first book, How to Dance with a Duke, was nominated for an RT Book Reviews Reviewers' Choice Award for First Historical Romance.

Her novella The Perks of Being a Beauty was the winner of the 2014 Gayle Wilson Award of Excellence for Best Novella.

The second book in Collins' Studies in Scandal series, Duke with Benefits,  was named a Kirkus Best Romance of 2017.

Books

Ugly Ducklings
How to Dance with a Duke, St. Martin's Press, 2012
How to Romance a Rake, St. Martin's Press, 2012
How to Entice an Earl, St. Martin's Press, 2013
The Perks of Being a Beauty (novella), St. Martin's Press, 2013

Wicked Widows
Why Dukes Say I Do, St. Martin's Press, 2013
Why Earls Fall in Love, St. Martin's Press, 2014
Why Lords Lose Their Hearts, St. Martin's Press, 2014
Once Upon a Christmas Kiss (novella), St. Martin's Press, 2014

The Lords of Anarchy
A Good Rake Is Hard to Find, St. Martin's Press, 2015
Good Earl Gone Bad, St. Martin's Press, 2015
Good Dukes Wear Black, St. Martin's Press, 2016
With This Christmas Ring, St. Martin's Press, 2017

Studies in Scandal
Ready Set Rogue, St. Martin's Press, 2017
Duke with Benefits, St. Martin's Press, 2017
Wallflower Most Wanted, St. Martin's Press, 2018
One for the Rogue, St. Martin's Press, 2018

Ladies Guide Series
A Lady's Guide to Mischief and Mayhem, Forever, 2020
An Heiress's Guide to Deception and Desire, Forever, 2021

Other works
Legally Yours, self-published, 2012

References

American women novelists
Living people
Year of birth missing (living people)
American romantic fiction novelists
Women romantic fiction writers
21st-century American novelists
21st-century American women writers
Writers from Mobile, Alabama